DJ Greatest Hits is the first compilation album of Filipino actor and singer Daniel Padilla under Star Records, released on December 19, 2016 in the Philippines. This album consist of eighteen songs; sixteen songs from his all-time hits since he started his music career, and two new songs "Reyna Ng Puso Ko", and "Basta Ikaw".

From his debut-self-titled-album Daniel Padilla there is Hinahanap-Hanap Kita, Ako'y Sa'yo, Ika'y Akin Lamang, Prinsesa, From his debut album, DJP; Nasa Iyo Na Ang Lahat, Kumusta Ka, Sabay Natin, Binibini, Naaalala. From his third studio album there is I Heart You and With A Smile. This album also included soundtrack contribution for his movie Crazy Beautiful You, Nothing's Gonna Stop Us Now featuring Morissette Amon,  "Pangako Sa ‘Yo," the theme song of his teleserye with Kathryn Bernardo, Walang Iba, as well as the chart-topper "Simpleng Tulad Mo". It also featured his latest title track from the fourth album I Feel Good, "I Got You (I Feel Good)" and his single Unlimited And Free.

Background and development
Star Music on December 18, 2016 revealed this album released on iTunes

Promotion and reception
On Wednesday, January 11, Star Music officially launched "Reyna Ng Puso Ko" and "Basta Ikaw" on MOR 101.9, via the program Heartbeats.

Track listing

Personnel

 Malou N. Santos & Roxy Liquigan – Executive Producers
 Roque 'Rox' B. Santos – Over-all Album Producer
 Jonathan Manalo – A&R/Audio Content Head
 Jayson Sarmiento – Promo Supervisor
 Jholina Luspo – Promo Specialist 
 London Angeles – Promo Associate
 Mella Ballano & Ron Care – Promo Coordinators 
 Marivic Benedicto – Star Song, inc and New Media Head
 Beth Faustio – Music Publishing Officer
 Luisa Ponceca – Music Publishing Specialist 
 Eaizen Almazan – New Media Technical Assistant
 Abbey Aledo – Music Servicing Officer
 Milette Quizon – Sales and Distribution
 Christine L. Cheng – Design and Layout
 Andrew Castillo – Creative Head
 Dante Tonedo - Album Master

Release history

External links

References

Star Music albums
2016 compilation albums
Daniel Padilla albums